Dobcross railway station served the village of Dobcross between 1912 and 1955.

History
The station was opened on 1 January 1912 as part of the London and North Western Railway route from Oldham to Delph.

The station closed on 2 May 1955, when the Delph Donkey passenger train service from Oldham to Delph via Greenfield was withdrawn.

References

An Illustrated History of Oldham's Railways by John Hooper

External links
Dobcross Station on navigable 1948 O.S. map

Disused railway stations in the Metropolitan Borough of Oldham
Former London and North Western Railway stations
Railway stations in Great Britain opened in 1912
Railway stations in Great Britain closed in 1955
1912 establishments in England
1955 disestablishments in England